Samuel Hamilton (January 1902 – 6 August 1925) was an Irish footballer who played in the Football League for Hull City. Hamilton died on 6 August 1925 at the age of 23 after suffering with a debilitating nasal condition.

References

1902 births
1925 deaths
Association football forwards
English Football League players
Association footballers from Northern Ireland
Dundela F.C. players
Bangor F.C. players
Ebbw Vale F.C. players
Hull City A.F.C. players